Suicide Notes and Butterfly Kisses is the debut studio album by American metalcore band Atreyu. It was released on June 4, 2002, under Victory Records. The album featured re-worked versions of the songs "Living Each Day Like You're Already Dead", "Someone's Standing on My Chest" and "Tulips Are Better", which originally appeared on the band's 2001 EP, Fractures in the Facade of Your Porcelain Beauty. "Ain't Love Grand" and "Lip Gloss and Black" were released as singles and music videos were also made for these two songs. The latter video found significant airplay on Headbangers Ball and Uranium in fall 2003.

The album has sold more than 240,000 copies worldwide (according to March 2006 Nielsen SoundScan data) and continues to rise.

It is the only album to feature bassist Chris Thomson.

The album was originally to be released under the title of The Death Rock Diaries. The album name change simply came from the band liking Suicide Notes and Butterfly Kisses more as a title.

Track listing

Limited edition re-release
On February 23, 2004, Victory Records re-released Suicide Notes and Butterfly Kisses as a "limited edition" with new liner notes from the band. The new version of the album shipped with a bonus DVD. The DVD contains a live concert featuring six songs at the Showcase Theatre, Corona, California held on December 27, 2003, two of the band's music videos, a documentary "Lairs" which takes a look at the homes of the band members, and biographies of the members of the band and crew, as follows:
"Deanne the Arsonist" (live video)
"Someone's Standing on My Chest" (live video)
"Ain't Love Grand" (live video)
"A Song for the Optimists" (live video)
"Dilated" (live video)
"Lip Gloss and Black" (live video)
"Ain't Love Grand" (music video)
"Lip Gloss and Black" (music video)
Documentary
Biographies
Only 25,000 copies of the limited edition version of the album were pressed and each copy is numbered in accordance.

Personnel

Band line-up
Alex Varkatzas - unclean vocals, lyricist
Dan Jacobs - lead guitar
Travis Miguel - rhythm guitar
Chris Thomson - bass guitar
Brandon Saller - drums, clean vocals, additional guitar, keyboard

Additional credits
Album artwork by Justin Borucki
Album layout by Paul Miner
DVD artwork (limited edition only) by Justin Borucki and Clifford Raines
DVD produced (limited edition only) by Maxx Padilla of Click Vision Productions
DVD concert footage (limited edition only) provided by Sean Stiegemeier
Guest vocals on "At Least I Know I'm a Sinner" performed by Efrem Schulz (Death by Stereo)
Mastered by Alan Douches
Ryan Saller - sitar
Piano on "Lip Gloss and Black" performed by Jaime Boepple
Recorded, mixed and produced by Eric Rachel

Charts
Album - Billboard (North America)

References

Atreyu (band) albums
2002 debut albums
Victory Records albums